The 2012–13 Hertha BSC season was the 120th season in club history. Hertha BSC lost to Fortuna Düsseldorf in the promotion/relegation playoff. The sports court and the Federal Court of the German Football Association (DFB) confirmed the club's relegation after the club appealed the result of the second leg, losing both appeals.

Defender Levan Kobiashvili was suspended for the remainder of the 2012 calendar year, whilst goalkeeper Thomas Kraft was suspended for five matches for their role in an altercation with the referee during the promotion/relegation playoff against Fortuna Düsseldorf. Christian Lell and Andre Mijatović were also suspended for their participation in the altercation. But both were eventually released from the club.

Review and events
Hertha BSC were relegated during the 2011–12 Bundesliga season after losing to 2. Bundesliga club Fortuna Düsseldorf in the promotion/relegation playoff. The sports court and the Federal Court of the DFB confirmed the relegation after the club appealed the result of the second leg and lost both appeals. The DFB also issued suspensions to several Hertha players—Levan Kobiashvili was banned for a year, Christian Lell was banned for six matches, Thomas Kraft was banned for five matches and Andre Mijatović was banned for four matches. Kobiashvili's suspension was reduced to seven and a half months and Lell's ban was reduced to 5 matches. The suspensions were for an altercation with the referee during the playoff with Fortuna Düsseldorf. Lell and Mijatović were eventually released by the club. The club itself was also disciplined for its role in the events of the second leg of the playoff, originally being issued a €50,000 fine and limited to 20,000 tickets sold for their league match against Paderborn 07. The fine, however, was later reduced to €40,000 and the ticket sale limit increased to 27,500. No tickets are allowed to be sold on the matchday. The club was also ordered to spend an additional €40,000 on a non-profit program as part of the discipline. Christian Lell, Andre Mijatović, Andreas Ottl and Patrick Ebert were all released from the club following the conclusion of the 2011–12 season.

Hertha BSC participated in the 2012–13 edition of the DFB-Pokal, where it was knocked out in the first round by Regionalliga Südwest side Wormatia Worms.

After its 1–0 win over SV Sandhausen on 21 April 2013, Hertha ensured direct promotion to the top-flight Bundesliga for the 2013–14 season. They later secured the 2012–13 2. Bundesliga title after defeating 1. FC Köln 2–1 on 12 May, their third 2. Bundesliga championship.

Match results

Legend

Friendly matches

2. Bundesliga

League results and fixtures

Table

Overall league table

Table summary

DFB-Pokal

Squad

Squad and statistics

Squad, appearances and goals scored
Sources:

 

|}

Bookings

Transfers

In

Out

Kits

Sources

External links
 2012–13 Hertha BSC season at Weltfussball.de 
 2012–13 Hertha BSC season at kicker.de 
 2012–13 Hertha BSC season at Fussballdaten.de 

Hertha BSC
Hertha BSC seasons